Henry Camarot is a former member of the Arizona House of Representatives. He served in the House from January 2001 through January 2003.

References

Democratic Party members of the Arizona House of Representatives
Living people
Year of birth missing (living people)